Minus or M-nus is a recording label based in Berlin, Germany and Windsor, Canada. It was created in 1998 by Richie Hawtin when Plus 8, a label previously created by Hawtin, was put on hold. By 2005, M-nus was releasing 2 to 3 CDs and 12 to 14 records per year.

As Hawtin said of the scaling down to a smaller label, "You learn better who you are, what you are, and how to better present that and present it creatively. With Minus, we wanted to slow it down and try new things…" In 2011 Hawtin's music technology company Liine released Remiix Minus, a remix-app for iOS which enables fans to recombine loops and samples from Minus artists.

Label roster
 Actual Jakshun
 Manclossi Deboroner
 Algoritmo, also known as   Plans Ospina
 Asher Perkins
 Barem
 Berg Nixon, also known as Ryan Crosson
 Click Box
 DJ Minx
 Fabrizio Maurizi
 Gaiser
 Gavin Lynch, also known as Matador
 Hobo
 I. A. Bericochea
 Joop Junior
 JPLS
 Justin James
 Loco Dice
 Marco Carola
 Mathew Jonson
 Matthew Dear (also known as Audion and False)
 Niederflur
 Paco Osuna
 Richie Hawtin, also recording as Plastikman
 Theorem (also known as Dale Lawrence)
 Thomas Brinkman
 Tractile - (Joel Boychuk and Adam Young)
 Whyt Noyz - also known as David Sidley

See also
 List of record labels
 List of electronic music record labels

References

External links
 
 
 Minus (record label) at Resident Advisor

Record labels established in 1998
Canadian independent record labels
Electronic music record labels
Techno record labels